Dreaming is a peer-reviewed academic journal published by the American Psychological Association on behalf of the International Association for the Study of Dreams. The journal covers research on dreaming, as well as on dreaming from the viewpoint of any of the arts and humanities. The current editor-in-chief is Deirdre Barrett (Harvard Medical School).

Abstracting and indexing 
According to the Journal Citation Reports, the journal has a 2020 impact factor of 0.76.

References

External links 
  with free sample articles
 International Association for the Study of Dreams

American Psychological Association academic journals
English-language journals
Psychology journals
Quarterly journals
Publications established in 1991
1991 establishments in the United States